The 1984 BRDC International Trophy (formally the XXXVI Marlboro / Daily Express International Trophy) was a Formula Two motor race held at Silverstone on 1 April 1984. It was the 36th running of the International Trophy, and the seventh and last under Formula Two regulations. It was also the opening race of the 1984 European Formula Two Championship.

Report

Entry
A total of 22 F2 cars were entered for the event, and all but the PMC Motorsport entry for Enrique Mansilla arrived for qualifying.

Qualifying
Roberto Moreno took pole position for Ralt Racing Ltd, in their Ralt-Honda RH6, averaging a speed of 141.094 mph.

Race
The race was held over 47 laps of the Silverstone Grand Prix circuit. Mike Thackwell took the winner spoils for works Ralt team, driving their Ralt-Honda RH6. Thackwell won in a time of 1hr 01:04.11mins., averaging a speed of 135.376 mph. Over 34 seconds behind was the second works Ralt of Roberto Moreno. The podium was completed by Michel Ferté, in his Martini Racing France/ORECA-entered Martini-BMW 001, albeit one lap adrift.

Classification

Race Result

 Fastest lap: Mike Thackwell, 1:16.00secs. (138.87 mph)

References

BRDC
European Formula Two Championship
BRDC International Trophy